FOH may refer to:
 Federal Occupational Health, a US government agency
 The Fires of Heaven, a novel by Robert Jordan
 First-order hold, a mathematical model used in digital signal reconstruction
 Force of Habit, a Canadian skate-punk band
 FOH, station code for Forest Hill railway station, in London
 Formula One Holdings, a motorsport promotion company
 Fortress Hill station, in Hong Kong
 Frederick's of Hollywood, an American lingerie retailer
 Friends of Humanity, a fictional organization in the Marvel Comics universe
 Front of house, term for publicly visible and accessible areas of a performance venue, restaurant, retail store, etc
 Front of House (magazine), a live audio trade journal
 Victor Bockarie Foh (born 1946), Sierra Leonean politician